The 1946 Merchant Marine Mariners football team was an American football team that represented the United States Merchant Marine Academy at Kings Point, New York, during the 1946 college football season. In its first season under head coach William Reinhart, the team compiled a 4–7 record and was outscored by a total of 259 to 173. In addition to being the head coach, Reinhart was a commander in the United States Merchant Marine and served as the academy's athletic director. 

The team played its home games at Kendrick Field in Kings Point, New York.

Schedule

References

Merchant Marine
Merchant Marine Mariners football seasons
Merchant Marine Mariners football